The 2016 Eurocup Finals were the concluding two games of the 2015–16 Eurocup season, the 14th season of Europe's secondary club basketball tournament organised by Euroleague Basketball, and the eighth season since it was renamed from the ULEB Cup to the Eurocup. The first leg was played at the Rhénus Sport in Strasbourg, France, on 22 April 2016 and the second leg was played at the Abdi İpekçi Arena in Istanbul, Turkey, on 27 April 2016, between French side Strasbourg and Turkish side Galatasaray Odeabank.

It was the first ever Finals appearance ever of Strasbourg and Galatasaray Odeabank, after Strasbourg never reached a stage further than the quarterfinals in history and Galatasaray Odeabank never reached a stage further than the semifinals in history.

Venues
The Rhénus Sport was the first leg venue as Strasbourg venue. In 1981, the arena was the venue of the European Champions Cup Final, in which Maccabi Tel Aviv defeated Sinudyne Bologna 80-79. In February 2006, the Davis Cup match between France and Sweden took place in this arena.

The Abdi İpekçi Arena was the second leg venue as Galatasaray Odeabank venue. The arena hosts national and international sports events such as basketball, volleyball, wrestling and weightlifting, concerts and congresses among others. The facility contains a multi-faced visual scoreboard, six online-system counters, four locker rooms, two internet rooms, a press room, two multi-purpose offices, VIP rooms, etc. Its parking lot has a capacity of 1,500 cars. It is named after the renowned Turkish journalist Abdi İpekçi.

Road to the Finals

Note: In the table, the score of the finalist is given first (H = home; A = away).

First leg

Second leg

See also
2016 Euroleague Final Four
2016 FIBA Europe Cup Final Four

External links
Official website

Finals
2016
2015–16 in French basketball
2015–16 in Turkish basketball
Sports competitions in Strasbourg
2016
International basketball competitions hosted by France
International basketball competitions hosted by Turkey